Piano Sonata in A-flat major may refer to:

 Piano Sonata No. 12 (Beethoven)
 Piano Sonata No. 31 (Beethoven)
 Piano Sonata in A-flat major, D 557 (Schubert)